Hasora discolor, the green awl, is a butterfly of the family Hesperiidae. It is found as several subspecies in Australia (where it is found along the south-eastern coast of New South Wales and the northern Gulf and north-eastern coast of Queensland), the Aru Islands, Irian Jaya, the Kei Islands, Maluku and Papua New Guinea.

The wingspan is about 40 mm.

The larvae feed on Mucuna gigantea and Mucuna novoguineensis. They live in a shelter made by cutting and folding a leaf and joining it by silk. Pupation takes place within this shelter.

Subspecies
Hasora discolor discolor
Hasora discolor mastusia Fruhstorfer, 1911 (Queensland, Aru Islands, Irian Jaya, Kei Islands, Papua New Guinea)

External links
Australian Insects
Australian Faunal Directory

Hesperiidae
Butterflies described in 1859